Pitt Meadows Water Aerodrome  is located  southwest of Pitt Meadows, British Columbia, Canada. It is situated on the banks of the Fraser River, at the southern edge of Pitt Meadows Airport.

See also
 List of airports in the Lower Mainland

References

Seaplane bases in British Columbia
Pitt Meadows
Registered aerodromes in British Columbia